St Mary's Church, Barnes, is the parish church of Barnes, formerly in Surrey and now in the London Borough of Richmond upon Thames.  It is a Grade II* listed building.

St Mary's Barnes is a thriving Christian community with an electoral roll of 350 and strong links across the local community. Along with the parishes of St Michael and All Angels, Barnes and Holy Trinity Barnes it forms the Barnes Team Ministry; the current Team Rector is Rev'd James Hutchings.

History
The church was built of coursed flint some time between 1100 and 1150. It was enlarged and re-consecrated in 1215, after the signing of Magna Carta, by Cardinal Stephen Langton (c. 1150–1228), who was Archbishop of Canterbury from 1207 to 1228.  It was extended to the west in the 13th century, and later to the east, creating a chancel. A west tower was added in the late 15th century. The north wall was demolished in the late 18th century to create a north aisle. The full set of eight bells in the tower was completed in 1897 to commemorate the Diamond Jubilee of Queen Victoria.

A major fire on 8 June 1978 destroyed parts of the church, but left the tower and Norman chapel almost intact. The church was restored by Edward Cullinan with the inclusion of elements of its former structure. The north wall contains a Gothic Revival east window. The church was re-dedicated in February 1984, with the original building now named as the Langton Chapel, commemorating Archbishop Stephen Langton. Doors in memory of Viera Gray were engraved by Josephine Harris.

Rectors

 1635–1643 John Cutts (sequestered)
 ——
 1660–1663† John Squire
 1663–1680† Edward Layfield
 1680–1681† Hezekiah Burton
 1681–1717 William Richardson
 1717–1727 Francis Hare (as Dean of Worcester, Dean of St Paul's from 1726)
 1727–1730† Robert Kilborn
 1730–1749† Samuel Baker
 1749–1758 John Hume (as Bishop of Bristol from 1756)
 1758–1768† Ferdinando Warner
 1768–1792† Christopher Wilson (as Bishop of Bristol from 1783)
 1792–1795 John Jeffreys
 1795–1839 John Jeffreys (son of previous)
 1840–1863 Reginald Edward Copleston
 1863–1871† Henry Melvill
 1871–1876 Peter Medd
 1876–1884 John Ellerton
 1885–1891† Lewis Taswell Lochee
 1891–1892† William Anthony Harrison
 1892–1923† Benjamin Meredyth Kitson
 1923–1937 William Patrick Dott
 ——
 1944-? Percy Steed
 1956-1963 Arthur Christopher Heath
 1963-? Basil Whitworth
 ——
 1981–1990 Juergen Simonson
 1990–2001 Richard Ames-Lewis
 2001–2010 Ross Collins
 2010–2018 Richard Sewell
 2019– James Hutchings

Notable burials
 Major General Roger Elliott (c. 1665–1714), who lived at Byfeld House in Church Road, Barnes, was buried in the churchyard in May 1714.
John Moody (c. 1727–1812), actor, who lived at 11 The Terrace, Barnes, c.1780 until his death, is buried in the churchyard with his two wives.

References

Further reading
Official Guidebook to The Parish Church of St. Mary, Barnes

Gallery

External links

1100s establishments in England
1978 fires in the United Kingdom
Barnes
Burned buildings and structures in the United Kingdom
Barnes
Churches in Barnes, London
Flint buildings
Grade II* listed churches in the London Borough of Richmond upon Thames
History of the London Borough of Richmond upon Thames
Rebuilt churches in the United Kingdom